"M" is a song written by Japanese singer Ayumi Hamasaki from her album I Am... (2002). The lead single from the album and Hamasaki's nineteenth overall, "M" marked Hamasaki's increased creative control over her music, as it was the first song she composed, under the pseudonym "CREA".

The single is to date one of Hamasaki's most commercially successful; it peaked at the top spot on the Oricon weekly charts, selling over 500,000 units on its first week. Moreover, the single eventually sold over 1,000,000 copies over its seventeen-week run and became a RIAJ-certified million-seller; "M" also won the Japan Gold Disc Award for "Song of the Year".

Background and themes
Shortly after the release of her studio album Duty, Hamasaki began writing "M". Before then, Hamasaki's staff had composed the melodies; Hamasaki only wrote the lyrics. However, with "M", Hamasaki felt that none of the melodies composed by her staff fit her vision of the song. Consequently, she decided to compose the melody herself. She began work on an electronic keyboard; however, as she had little proficiency in the instrument, Hamasaki eventually resorted to singing the melody into a voice recorder.

Throughout the song, Hamasaki addresses "Maria". Hamasaki is ambiguous as to the identity of "Maria"; however, she has stated that the song was inspired by a story told to her by a friend about a saint named Mary. The story was pivotal in the shaping of the theme of the song, which, according to Hamasaki, is about a "woman who won't change with time". Finally, like other songs from I am..., Hamasaki explores the topics of couples and love.

Composition and musical style

According to Hamasaki, the melodies composed by her staff for "M" did not fit her image for the song because they were too "warm"—she had envisioned a melody with a "cold" feeling. That, according to Hamasaki, meant a melody that was "difficult to grasp" and started in a lower key before progressing to a higher key. The song is written in common time and begins in the key of C major before progressing to the key of C-sharp major. The song uses piano, electric guitar, triangle, and various stringed instruments.

"M", unlike Hamasaki's antecedent songs, does not follow the verse-chorus form; rather, the song opens with an introduction that is followed by a brief instrumental bridge that precedes two verses. The verses are followed by a pre-chorus after which comes an instrumental bridge; that is followed by a repetition of the pre-chorus and the verse. The chorus and a repetition of it follow; the chorus and its repetition are separated by another instrumental bridge. Finally, a second verse is sung before the repetition of the introduction, at which point the song ends.

Music video

The music video for "M", directed by Wataru Takeishi, opens with Hamasaki singing the introduction against a stained-glass window. The first instrumental bridge follows, during which is seen the exterior of a church. When the first verse starts, the doors of the church open and glowing particles sweep into the church; at the start of the second instrumental bridge, the particles merge and Hamasaki appears in a white gown, at the intersection of the transept and the aisle, also in this scene she is wearing blue contacts. When the chorus starts, Hamasaki is seen outside the church (no longer in a gown) singing with her band; subsequent scenes switch between Hamasaki singing outside the church and standing inside. At the end of the video, the glowing particles sweep out of the church and the gown-clad Hamasaki disappears.

Chart performance and sales
"M" debuted at the number-one position on the Oricon weekly charts on its first week of release, selling 541,350 copies. The single remained atop the charts the second week; however, the total sales for that week had dropped to 185,290. The sales rose the third week: the single sold 246,150 copies; however, it was only able to reach the number-two position, as Every Little Thing's single "Fragile/Jirenma" debuted that week with 278,120 copies. By the fourth week, "M" remained at the number-two position with 95,770 copies sold. It remained in the Top 10 the following three weeks, dropping from the number-five position to the number-seven position. It remained in the Top 30 for two more weeks; it reached the twenty-third position before dropping out. By the end of its nine-week run in the Oricon Top 30, "M" sold 1,279,830 copies, making it the best-selling single from I am... and adding to Hamasaki's million-selling singles.

Accolades

In early 2014, in honor of Hamasaki's sixteenth-year career milestone, Japanese website Goo.ne.jp hosted a poll for fans to rank their favorite songs by Hamasaki out of thirty positions; the poll was held in only twenty-four hours, and thousands submitted their votes. As a result, "M" was ranked at #2 behind Seasons, with 93.2 percent of the votes.

Additionally, the Above & Beyond remix is considered a vocal trance classic, ranking at #653 in Trance Top 1000 in 2011, and #177 in A State of Trance Top 1000 in 2021.

Track listings

Japanese maxi-single
 "M" (original mix)
 "M" (Dub's Hard Pop Remix)
 "Seasons" (Yuta's Weather Report Mix)
 "M" (Nicely Nice Winter Parade Remix)
 "Far Away" (Laugh & Peace Mix)
 "M" (Rewired Mix)
 "M" (Smokers Mix)
 "M" (Rank-M Mix)
 "M" (Neurotic Eye's Mix)
 "M" (original mix instrumental)

Japanese 2×12-inch vinyl E.P.
A1. "M" (Above & Beyond Typhoon bub mix)
B1. "Boys & Girls (Push instrumental dub)
B2. "Unite!" (Airwave dub)
C1. "Unite!" (Airwave remix)
C2. "Appears" (Armin van Buuren's Sunset dub)
D1. "Unite!" (Moogwai dub)
D2. "Audience" (Darren Tate instrumental)

German 12-inch vinyl (Part 1)
A. "M" (Above & Beyond Typhoon dub mix)
B. "M" (Above & Beyond vocal mix)

German 12-inch vinyl (Part 2)
A1. "M" (Van Eyden vs. M.O.R.P.H. remix) – 7:31
B1. "M" (Tectonic Shift vs. André Visior remix) – 7:55
B2. "M" (Above & Beyond instrumental mix) – 7:47

German maxi-single
 "M" (Above & Beyond edit) – 4:20
 "M" (Van Eyden vs. M.O.R.P.H. remix edit) – 4:19
 "M" (Tectonic Shift vs. André Visior remix edit) – 3:36
 "M" (Above & Beyond Vocal dub mix) – 8:11
 "M" (Above & Beyond Typhoon dub mix) – 8:31
 "M" (Above & Beyond vocal mix) – 8:01

Personnel
Vocals: Ayumi Hamasaki
Melodic Composition: Ayumi Hamasaki (under the pseudonym "CREA")
Arrangement: HΛL
Mixing: Koji Morimoto
Production: Max Matsuura
Sound production: Naoto Suzuki
Production assisting: Yuka Akiyama
Mastering: Shigeo Miyamoto

Charts

Release history

References

Walters, Barry. "Turning (Japanese) Point". Village Voice. May 5, 2002. Retrieved July 5, 2008.
The liner notes for "M" (Overseas CD version). Avex Trax. AVCD-30197

External links
 "M" information at Avex Network.
 "M" information at Oricon.
 

Ayumi Hamasaki songs
2000 singles
Oricon Weekly number-one singles
Songs written by Ayumi Hamasaki
Song recordings produced by Max Matsuura
2000 songs